Hans H. König (1912-2003) was a German screenwriter and film director.  After the Second World War he entered the German film industry due to the assistance of his brother Richard König, a film producer. After being employed as assistant director on And the Heavens Above Us in 1947 he then worked as a screenwriter before progressing to film direction. Most of his films were produced by his brother and several featured Richard's wife Edith Mill. After his film career ended Hans turned to novel writing.

Selected filmography
 Everything for the Company (1950)
 Drei Kavaliere (1951)
 The Imaginary Invalid (1952)
 Roses Bloom on the Moorland (1952)
 The Little Town Will Go to Sleep (1954)
 Dear Miss Doctor (1954)
 The Fisherman from Heiligensee (1955)
 Das Erbe vom Pruggerhof (1956)
 Two Bavarians in St. Pauli (1956)
 Jägerblut (1957)
 The Winemaker of Langenlois (1957)
 Between Munich and St. Pauli (1957)

References

Bibliography 
 Goble, Alan. The Complete Index to Literary Sources in Film. Walter de Gruyter, 1999.
 Noack, Frank. Veit Harlan: The Life and Work of a Nazi Filmmaker. University Press of Kentucky, 2016.

External links 
 

1912 births
2003 deaths
Film people from Berlin
German screenwriters
German film directors

de:Hans H. König